Samuel Bindon  was an Irish politician.

Bindon was educated at Trinity College, Dublin. He sat in the Irish House of Commons from 1715 to 1760 as a Member of Parliament (MP) for the borough of Ennis in County Clare.

References

Alumni of Trinity College Dublin
Members of the Parliament of Ireland (pre-1801) for County Clare constituencies
Irish MPs 1715–1727
Irish MPs 1727–1760